Presidential elections were held in Sudan between 10 and 20 April 1977. Jaafar Nimeiry was the only candidate, and received 99.1% of the vote, with a 98.3% turnout.

Results

References

1977 in Sudan
Presidential elections in Sudan
Sudan
Single-candidate elections
April 1977 events in Africa
Election and referendum articles with incomplete results